The Egypt men's national under-21 volleyball team, represents Egypt in international volleyball competitions and friendly matches. The team is six-time African Champion.

Results
 Champions   Runners up   Third place   Fourth place

Green border color indicates tournament was held on home soil.

FIVB U21 World Championship

African Championship U21

Team

Current squad
The following is the Egyptian roster in the 2017 FIVB Volleyball Men's U21 World Championship.

Head coach: Maged Mohamed Mostafa

References

External links
 www.fevb.org 

Volleyball
National men's under-21 volleyball teams
Volleyball in Egypt
Men's sport in Egypt